Vieux-Boulogne (also known as Sablé du Boulonnais) is an unpasteurized, unpressed cow's-milk cheese made in the Pas-de-Calais département around the town of Boulogne-sur-Mer in France. It was developed in 1982 by Antoine Bernard and Philippe Olivier.

Description
It has a soft, elastic central pâte, surrounded by a moist, red-orange washed rind that is washed in beer during production. The cheese is pre-salé (pre-salted).

Vieux-Boulogne is famed for its strong smell, and in November 2004 was found by researchers at Cranfield University to be the "smelliest" of 15 French and British cheeses that they tested.  A follow-up test done by the same institution using "electronic nose" sensors in March 2007 reaffirmed Vieux-Boulogne's status as the world's "smelliest" cheese.

References 

Vieux Boulogne
Boulogne-sur-Mer
Cow's-milk cheeses
Washed-rind cheeses
Picardy cuisine